Galianemys is an extinct genus of turtle in the family Bothremydidae, discovered in the Kem Kem Beds.

References

Further reading 
 Gaffney E. S., Tong H., et al (2002) Galianemys, a new side-necked turtle (Pelomedusoides: Bothremydidae) from the Late Cretaceous of Morocco, American Museum Novitates 3379, 1-20

 Gaffney E. S., Tong H., et al (2006) Evolution of the side-necked turtles: The families Bothremydidae, Euraxemydidae, and Araripemydidae, Bulletin of the American Museum of Natural History 300, 1-318

Bothremydidae
Prehistoric turtle genera
Fossil taxa described in 2002
Extinct turtles